Piet Verhaert (Antwerp, 25 February 1852 – Oostduinkerke, 4 August 1908) was a Belgian painter. He was a member of Les XX.

Life and career
Verhaert was a painter and etcher of townscapes, interiors, figures and portraits. He was also a notable painter of decorative panels. Trained at the Academy of Antwerp, he originally studied sculpting but switched to painting. He was part of a group of young artists known as the "Van Beers Clique", led by Jan van Beers. This group included the artists Alexander Struys and Jef Lambeaux. They were well known for their mischievous and eccentric behaviour, which included walking around Antwerp dressed in historic costumes.

He travelled to The Netherlands, Italy and later Spain. He debuted in 1873 at the Triannual Salon van Antwerpen. He stayed for a year in Paris in 1876.

During his time in Spain (1882–83), he made copies from Velázquez. He was a member of Les XX ("The Twenty"), a founder of the Society Aquafortistes and a teacher at the Academy of Antwerp from 1886. He painted, predominantly, genre scenes of the 17th and 18th centuries. From the beginning of the 1880s he painted his own designs, working in plein-air style. Later, brown became the dominant colour of his work. He is best known for his depictions of the old street districts of Antwerp, was considered to be a powerful colourist and was a virtuoso with a pencil. He painted a fresco in the Antwerp City Hall (1899) and made an album of etchings on the old districts of Antwerp. His works may be found in the museums of Antwerp, Brussels, Doornik and Ghent.

Selected paintings

References

External links

Odis Databank: Biography and curriculum vitae
Schoonselhof: Biography of Verhaert
Arcadja Auctions: Works by Verhaert
Piet Verhaert at the British Museum

1852 births
1908 deaths
Royal Academy of Fine Arts (Antwerp) alumni
Academic staff of the Royal Academy of Fine Arts (Antwerp)
19th-century Belgian painters
19th-century Belgian male artists